The SPG-9 Kopyo (Spear) (Russian: СПГ-9 Копьё) is a tripod-mounted man-portable, 73 millimetre calibre recoilless gun developed by the Soviet Union. It fires fin-stabilised, rocket-assisted high explosive (HE) and high-explosive anti-tank (HEAT) shaped charge projectiles similar to those fired by the 73 mm 2A28 Grom low pressure gun of the BMP-1 armored vehicle. It was accepted into service in 1962, replacing the B-10 recoilless rifle.

Description

The launch charge also imparts spin to the projectile by a series of offset holes. For the PG-9 projectile, this takes it to a velocity of  before the motor burns out.

The SPG-9 is heavy, ~, and normally transported by vehicle, and carried into position by its two crew. It can be deployed in about a minute. The weapon is in service with a large number of armed forces, and a variety of ammunition is produced; however, they are mostly copies of the original Soviet PG-9 HEAT and OG-9 fragmentation (FRAG) high explosive (FRAG-HE) rounds.

The SPG-9 is widely available to terrorists and maritime pirates such as in the Horn of Africa region, and in other regions to a lesser degree. It is not as popular as the RPG-7 because it must be mounted on a vehicle or boat and cannot be easily carried and shoulder fired. The SPG-9 requires much more skill to fire accurately than the RPG-7. There have been reports of these mounted in skiffs and larger "mother ships". The SPG-9 can typically be found mounted on a wide variety of vehicles known as "technicals" in Somalia.

A variant for use with airborne troops including detachable wheels was built as the SPG-9D.

Combat use
The SPG-9 was used by both sides during the Transnistria War,

Projectiles

Users

  
  /  :  manufactured locally as Arsenal ATGL
 
 
 
 : AMIG SPG-9
 

 
 
 
  / : RomArm AG-9
 
 
 
 , also used by separatist forces
 SPG-9T2

Non-state actors
 
  Iraqi Kurdistan
  Islamic State
  Lord's Resistance Army
  Kurdistan Workers' Party
  Sudan People's Liberation Movement-in-Opposition
  Sudan People's Liberation Movement-North
  Free Syrian Army

See also
 SPG-82

Notes

External links
 

Recoilless rifles of the Soviet Union
Weapons of Bulgaria
Weapons of Romania
Military equipment introduced in the 1960s